Nadir Bendahmane (born 9 June 1992) is an Algerian former professional footballer who played as a forward. An Algerian under-17 international, he represented Algeria at the 2009 African U-17 Championship where he finished as the second top scorer with four goals.

Club career
Bendahmane began his playing career in a local club in the town of Miramas. He then went on to play for the academies of Istres, Cannes and Grenoble.

On 30 June 2011, Bendahmane left relegated Grenoble and signed a one-year contract with Clermont. On 28 October 2011, he made his professional debut for Clermont as a 91st-minute substitute in a league match against Troyes.

International career
In 2009, Bendahmane was selected as part of Algeria's under-17 national team for the 2009 African Under-17 Championship
 He scored four goals in the competition, was second top scorer behind Gambia's Ebrima Bojang, and helped Algeria finish second and qualify for the 2009 FIFA U-17 World Cup in Nigeria. However, he was not selected in the final squad for the U-17 World Cup after repeatedly failing to show up for training camps prior to the tournament.

References

External links
 
 

1992 births
Living people
Association football forwards
Algeria youth international footballers
Algerian footballers
AS Cannes players
Clermont Foot players
FC Istres players
Grenoble Foot 38 players
Ligue 2 players
21st-century Algerian people